A powerbomb is a professional wrestling throw in which an opponent is lifted (usually so that they are sitting on the wrestler's shoulders) and then slammed back-first down to the mat. The standard powerbomb sees an opponent first placed in a standing headscissors position (bent forward with their head placed between the attacking wrestler's thighs). The opponent is then lifted on the wrestler's shoulders and slammed down back-first to the mat. A prawn hold is commonly used for a pinning powerbomb.

Powerbombs are sometimes used in mixed martial arts competitions, when a fighter attempts to slam another fighter who has him trapped in a triangle choke. In professional wrestling, it is also sometimes used by a bigger wrestler as a counter to an attempted hurricanrana by a smaller wrestler. While it was associated with super-heavyweight wrestlers, the move was invented by Lou Thesz.

Variations

Argentine powerbomb
The wrestler first places their opponent face-up across their shoulders, as in an Argentine backbreaker rack, hooks the head with one hand and a leg with the other, and the wrestler will then spin the opponent's head away from them, dropping the opponent down to the mat. Often the wrestler drops to a seated position while spinning the opponent. Innovated by Lioness Asuka, who called it the Towerhacker Bomb and popularized by A.J. Styles as the Rack Bomb.

Chokebomb
Also known as a sitout two-handed chokeslam and a choke driver. The most common move referred to as a chokebomb sees an attacking wrestler grasps an opponent's neck with both hands and then lift them up into the air. From here the attacking wrestler would throw the opponent back down to the mat while falling to a seated position. This would see the opponent land in a position where their legs are wrapped around the wrestler with their back and shoulders on the mat. This allows the attacking wrestler to lean forward and place both their arms on the opponent for a pinfall attempt. A falling version exists, and usually ends with the attacking wrestler pinning the opponent immediately while still holding the throat after the move has already been executed. It was used by Albert, The Great Khali, The Wifebeater/Matt Martini and Tara.

Crucifix powerbomb

The wrestler places the opponent's head in between their legs, then grabs the opponent's stomach, lifts the opponent over their shoulder, and holds both their arms in a cross position over their head. The wrestler finally runs or falls to their knees and throws the opponent onto the mat back and neck first. Sheamus employs the running variation, dubbing it the High Cross. The falling variation is often associated with Razor Ramon, who called it  Razor's Edge (also known as the Outsider's Edge or Diamonds Edge during his time in WCW as Scott Hall). Hall also (though rarely) used a version of this move with the opponent positioned on the second rope away from him. Damian Priest uses the move to pay tribute to the latter. The throwing variation is used by both Bad Luck Fale and Hernandez.

Sitout crucifix powerbomb
Also known as a Niagara Driver, Splash Mountain, or Black Tiger Bomb, this powerbomb is similar to the Crucifix Powerbomb, but instead of the wrestler falling forward to drop the opponent, the attacking wrestler falls to a seated position for a pinfall attempt instead of releasing the opponent. Innovated by Kyoko Inoue and popularized by Black Tiger. A top rope version was used by Konnan as well. It is used by Roman Reigns as a signature move.

Dangan Bomb
This move, invented by Masato Tanaka, is performed when the wrestler will put the opponent in to the position for a belly to back suplex, lift them up and then catch them in mid air as if going for a spinebuster but instead put the opponents legs on their shoulders then drives the opponent to the mat like a falling powerbomb.

Double powerbomb
Due to convenience of wording this name can refer to a maneuver either performed by two persons on one, or one person on two; generally both opponents will be far smaller than the wrestler attempting the move. One opponent is placed on the attackers shoulders as per a standard powerbomb, then the other will be placed on the first opponents shoulders, facing in the same direction. This is normally performed by putting the first opponent's head between the seconds legs while they are sitting on the second or top turnbuckle. Finally, both opponents will be slammed to the mat.

Double underhook powerbomb
Also known as a Tiger Driver or Tiger Bomb. The wrestler faces a bent over opponent, and hooks each of the opponent's arms behind the opponent's back. The wrestler then lifts the opponent in the air and flips them over, throwing them back down and driving the back and shoulders of the opponent to the ground. The wrestler may also fall to their knees as they slam the opponent down. A sitout version is commonly known as a Tiger Driver and was invented by Mitsuharu Misawa. Ahmed Johnson used the sitout version as well, calling it the Pearl River Plunge. Tyler Bate uses the move as his finishing maneuver, calling it the Tyler Driver '97 and Toni Storm calling it Storm Zero.

Kneeling double underhook powerbomb 
Another variation credited to Misawa is the Tiger Driver '91. In this version, the wrestler keeps the arm hooks applied during the entire move, causing their opponent to land on their head, neck, and shoulders. The title refers to the January 29, 1991 match in which Misawa debuted the maneuver against Akira Taue. Mitsuharu Misawa popularized the move as Tiger Driver 91'''. Kota Ibushi uses this move as finishing move. Masahiro Chono used it as finishing move on rare occasions, most famously used to win the first ever G1 Climax. It is rarely attempted due to the dangerous nature of the move.

Elevated powerbomb
This move is similar to a standard powerbomb. Instead of slamming the opponent directly on the mat from the shoulders, the attacking wrestler first lifts the opponent even higher by holding onto the opponent and extending their arms up, lifting the opponent up off the shoulders of the attacking wrestler just moments before slamming them down to the mat. This move was used prominently by The Undertaker, who named it the Last Ride. A sitout version is used by Kota Ibushi, who calls it the Golden Star Powerbomb, and a pop up variation is used by Keith Lee, who calls it the Spirit Bomb as a homage to Dragon Ball Z.

Falling powerbomb
This move starts by lifting an opponent like a normal powerbomb, but when the opponent is on the wrestler's shoulders the wrestler falls forward, slamming the opponent onto the ground. This move was popularized by Kane.

Fireman's carry powerbomb 
The wrestler lifts the opponent onto their shoulders, into the fireman's carry position. The wrestler grabs hold of the opponent's near leg with one hand, and their head with the other, then pushes the opponent's upper body up and simultaneously spins them, causing them to end up in front of the wrestler face up. The wrestler then either sits down or stays standing. They may also wrap their hands around the opponent's upper legs.

Folding powerbomb
The move sees the wrestler lifts the opponent and drops them on the mat, while sliding forward and lifts his legs off the mat, putting his full body weight on top of the wrestler and thus pinning their shoulders more firmly against the mat. Popularized by Genichiro Tenryu, Toshiaki Kawada and recently WALTER. Samoa Joe used this to transition into a number of submission holds.

Ganso bomb
Translated literally from Japanese as Originator Bomb (元祖 ganso) but in English more commonly referred to as the original powerbomb, this move sees the attacking wrestler make an opponent bend over and grab them in a belly to back waistlock before then lifting the opponent until they are vertical. The attacking wrestler then drives the opponent down on their neck and shoulder while either remaining in a standing position, sitting position or dropping down to their knees. The move is considered one of the most dangerous moves in professional wrestling as the person taking the move is in freefall, dropped onto their own head or neck without protection. It was invented by Lou Thesz and popularized by Toshiaki Kawada as the Kawada Driver. AJ Styles used during his tenure with New Japan Pro-Wrestling as the Hollow Point. Brock Lesnar unknowingly used the move on Hardcore Holly in 2002 that legitimately injured his neck. This was actually due to attempt by Holly sandbagging the move, not cooperating by acting as dead weight, making it difficult for Lesnar.

Gutwrench powerbomb
This move involves a wrestler standing over a bent over opponent, locking their arms around the opponent's waist and lifting them up, flipping them over, and slamming them down to the mat back first. The difference compared to a regular powerbomb is that the opponent's head does not go between the wrestler's thighs, instead they remain slightly in front or to the side of the wrestler. The falling variation was used by Jack Swagger as the Swagger Bomb. "Dr. Death" Steve Williams popularized the sitout variation, naming it the Doctor Bomb. Kenny Omega also uses the sitout variation as the Dr. Willy Bomb.

Inverted powerbomb
Also known as an Inverted front powerslam, this move sees the attacking wrestler faces a bent-over opponent and apply a gutwrench waistlock before lifting the opponent up so they are lying across the wrestler's shoulder, facing upward, with the wrestler maintaining the waistlock to hold them in position, known as an overhead gutwrench backbreaker rack. The wrestler then falls forward, standing or into a sitout position while flipping the opponent forward, driving the opponent horizontally belly-down into the ground. A double underhook version of this move also exists. Ron Simmons made the standing variation famous, calling it the Dominator, Bobby Lashley utilized a kneeling version as a finisher, while Yujiro Takahashi popularized the sitout version, calling it Tokyo Pimps.

Jackknife Hold powerbomb
A normal powerbomb which is ended with the wrestler flipping or rolling forward into a bridge with a jackknife hold. Not to be confused with Kevin Nash's finisher, referred to as the Jackknife Powerbomb but is actually a release powerbomb.

Kneeling powerbomb
This variation of a powerbomb is similar to an ordinary powerbomb, however, instead of the wrestler remaining standing, the wrestler falls into a kneeling position while driving the opponent back-first into the mat. Triple H has used this version of the Powerbomb.

Multiple powerbombs
As the name implies, the wrestler performing the move will do so multiple times. To start, they will lift the opponent into powerbomb position and perform the move. Without letting go of the opponent's waist, the wrestler raises them up again and drops them. Depending on the wrestler, they may continue to repeat the process and may pin the opponent after the last one. Although neither wrestler does this anymore, Chris Jericho and Brock Lesnar used the multiple powerbomb as a signature maneuver when they debuted in WWE; Jericho's version was a double and Lesnar's a triple. AEW wrestler Wardlow uses it as a finisher called Powerbomb Symphony.

Pop-up powerbomb
As the name implies, this move begins with the opponent rushing towards the attacker who then flings the opponent vertically up into the air. The move is finished by catching the opponent and performing a powerbomb. This move was popularized by Kevin Owens and Scott Steiner.

Release powerbomb
A variation of the powerbomb where the opponent is lifted into the air and then dropped without being forced into a pin. 

Kevin Nash, Big Van Vader, Bubba Ray Dudley, Chris Benoit, Sycho Sid, Lita, Sara Del Rey, John Bradshaw Layfield and Sable use this move. Raquel Rodriguez uses a one-arm version of the move itself, calling it the Chingona/Texana Bomb.

Rope-aided powerbomb
The wrestler takes hold of an opponent, who is lying on the mat, by their legs. The opponent then grabs hold of one of the ropes with both hands as the wrestler pulls them backwards, lifting them off the mat. At this point the opponent releases their grip on the rope and is brought down to the mat.

Corner sitout powerbomb
The opponent begins sitting in the corner of the ring and facing outwards, while holding on to the ring ropes. The wrestler takes hold of the opponent by the legs and pulls them upwards and backwards with a twist, falling into a sitting position as they do so. The move ends with the opponent's back on the ground and their legs over the shoulders of the wrestler, placing the opponent in a pinning predicament.

Running powerbomb
In this variation of the powerbomb, the wrestler runs before they releases the opponent. A wrestler may also sit down for a pinfall attempt.

Scoop lift powerbomb
In this variation of a powerbomb an opponent is first scooped so they are horizontal across an attacking wrestler's chest. The wrestler then pushes the opponent up and turns them, so that they are sitting on the shoulders of the wrestler, before then slamming them down in a powerbomb motion. A seated version is also possible. This maneuver was occasionally performed by "The Alpha Male" Monty Brown and was referred to as the Alpha Bomb. Raquel Rodriguez uses a one arm version of the powerbomb.

Sitout powerbomb
In this variation of a powerbomb, the attacking wrestler falls to a seated position as they slam the opponent down. Some wrestlers remain in seated position to pin the opponent, while others choose not to. The move can either be performed as a standard powerbomb or as a gutwrench powerbomb. The move was popularized by Jushin Liger, who used it as a finisher, known as the Liger Bomb, and was also famously used by Batista as the Batista Bomb, and an elevated variant is currently used by Keith Lee as the Spirit Bomb.

Slingshot powerbomb
From a position in which the opponent is sitting across the wrestlers shoulder, the attacker bounces the opponent's back across the top rope. The attacker then spins around, using the momentum to powerbomb the opponent. This move is most commonly associated with the Miz.

Spinning powerbomb

Also called a spiral bomb. The wrestler lifts the opponent up onto their shoulders and spins around several rotations before sitting down and slamming the opponent down to the mat, as in a sitout powerbomb. A release variation sees the wrestler remain standing or kneeling and just throwing the opponent away from them onto their back to the mat. A gutwrench variation is also possible, with the wrestler dropping the opponent as in a normal gutwrench powerbomb. This maneuver was used by Diamond Dallas Page, but the sitout variation was popularized by Michael Elgin, who adopted it as his finisher.

Spin-out powerbomb
Also known as a Blue Thunder Driver or a Blue Thunder Bomb, this is a belly-to-back powerbomb, usually beginning in the back suplex position in which the wrestler stands behind their opponent and puts their head under the arm of the opponent. They then lift the opponent up using one arm around the waist of the opponent and another under their legs. The wrestler then spins the opponent around 180°, dropping them to the mat back first as they drop to a sitting position. Invented by Jun Akiyama, it is used by Sami Zayn as a signature move. Apollo Crews uses a toss variation of the move. John Cena uses a kneeling variation of the move.

Straight jacket powerbomb
Also known as a Pyramid Driver, this move can be executed when a wrestler lifts the opponent on the shoulders between the legs, but crossing the both arms during his bent-over position before, and drops on the mat with a seated position to setup a pin. It was used by Super Crazy with the name called Crazy Bomb and by Cesaro in a Sit-Out variation.

Sunset flip powerbomb

This move sees the wrestler bend over and place their opponent in a standing head scissors. However, the wrestler moves forward slightly so the opponent's midsection is between the wrestler's thighs instead of their head. The wrestler wraps their arms around the opponent's midsection in a waistlock, then jumps and rolls forward, under the opponent's legs, and into a seated position, forcing the opponent to fall back to the mat. The resulting position can lead to a sitout pin. This is often called a Yoshi Tonic in Japan or Code Red in America, the latter name coined by Amazing Red. The top rope version is also used sometimes, as seen in the picture above. The move is also very dangerous, because when the wrestler flips over the opponent's back, if they put too much downward force on their legs, it could result in a leg injury. Seth Rollins was injured while attempting to perform a sunset flip powerbomb by applying too much downward force on his leg, thus injuring it. An avalanche leg trap variation is used by Hirooki Goto on rare occasions as Kaiten.Superbomb
The attacking wrestler forces the opponent to ascend to the top rope, standing usually on the top ropes with their legs spread. The wrestler then bends the opponent, placing their head between the wrestler's thighs. The wrestler then wraps their hands around the opponent's waist. The wrestler then lifts the opponent up, flipping them over, while jumping forward. The opponent falls down to the mat back first, and the wrestler usually falls to their knees or to a sitting position. This variation was popularized by Chris Candido as the Blonde Bombshell, while Bubba Ray Dudley used a sitout version.

Another variation sees the opponent sitting on the top rope. The wrestler climbs up to the top rope and stands facing the opponent. The wrestler then bends the opponent over and takes hold of opponent around the waist. The wrestler then flips the opponent up and over so they are sitting on the shoulders of the wrestler. At the same time, the wrestler spins around 180° and leaps forward, falling to the ground in a standing or sitting position and driving the opponent's back and shoulders to the mat.

Another variant of the Superbomb was popularized by B. J. Whitmer, who used the move to toss himself and fellow wrestler Jimmy Jacobs into a crowd at a Ring of Honor show in June 2006.

Thunder Fire powerbomb

The wrestler faces a bent opponent and places them in the standing headscissors position (bent forward with their head placed between the wrestler's thighs). The wrestler then grabs hold around the opponent's upper torso or waist, and lifts them on top of one of the wrestler's shoulders on their back. The wrestler then bends forward and slams the opponent down to the mat on their back or shoulders. It is also known as an over-the-shoulder powerbomb. Innovated by the Great Nita (Atsushi Onita).

Triple powerbomb
A powerbomb performed by three wrestlers. Two wrestlers lift an opponent with a belly-to-back hold and place the opponent's legs on the third partner's shoulders, who executes the powerbomb while the other two push the opponent from the carrying partner's shoulders. There is also an avalanche variation of this move performed from the middle rope. This was popularized by The Shield in WWE.

Turnbuckle powerbomb
Also known as the Buckle Bomb. This move sees the wrestler faces a standing opponent, bends them forwards, takes a hold around their waist and then flips the opponent up and over so the opponent is sitting on the wrestler's shoulders. The wrestler then faces a corner of the ring and throws the opponent into the corner, driving the back and neck of the opponent to the turnbuckle. The move was famously used by Kenta Kobashi and Seth Rollins. The move is considered to be dangerous if done wrong, which led to Sting retiring from wrestling (he has since returned to the ring in 2020 with AEW) and Finn Balor injuring his shoulder in 2016. WWE has since banned it in 2020 after Nia Jax botched the move on Kairi Sane.

Suplex powerbomb
The wrestler lifts the opponent upside down as in a vertical suplex and then pushes their upper body forward while sitting down, ending the move in the same position as the sitout powerbomb. A fall-forward and standing versions are also possible. The move was invented by Kenta Kobashi who called it Orange Crush. El Generico used the move with a double pumphandle cradle before delivering the Orange Crush.'' Jon Moxley and Roderick Strong used the standing version.

References

Professional wrestling moves